Judy Wajcman,   is the Anthony Giddens Professor of Sociology at the London School of Economics and Political Science. She is the Principal Investigator of the Women in Data Science and AI project at The Alan Turing Institute. She is also a Visiting Professor at the Oxford Internet Institute. Her scholarly interests encompass the sociology of work, science and technology studies, gender theory, and organizational analysis. Her work has been translated into French, German, Greek, Italian, Korean, Japanese, Portuguese, Russian, Chinese and Spanish. Prior to joining the LSE in 2009, she was a Professor of Sociology in the Research School of Social Sciences at the Australian National University. She was the first woman to be appointed the Norman Laski Research Fellow (1978–80) at St. John's College, Cambridge. In 1997 she was elected Fellow of the Academy of the Social Sciences in Australia.

Wajcman was President of the  Society for the Social Studies of Science (2009-2011), and is the recipient of the William F. Ogburn Career Achievement Award of the American Sociological Association (2013). She received an honorary doctorate from the University of Geneva (2015) and was elected a Fellow of the British Academy (2016). Her book Pressed for Time is the (2017) winner of the Ludwik Fleck prize of the Society for Social Studies of Science. In 2018, she received the Lifetime Achievement Award from the Oxford Internet Institute. In 2021, she was awarded the John Desmond Bernal prize by the Society for Social Studies of Science.

Research 
Wajcman is probably best known for her analysis of the gendered nature of technology. She was an early contributor to the social studies of technology, as well as to studies of gender, work, and organisations.

Selected bibliography

Books 
 
 
 
 
 
 
 
 
 Wajcman, Judy; Dodd, Nigel (2017).The sociology of speed: Digital, organizational, and social temporalities. Oxford, United Kingdom Oxford University Press. . OCLC 952384327.

Book chapters

Journal articles 
 
 
 
 
 
 
 
 
 
 
 
 
 
 
‘How Silicon Valley sets Time’, New Media & Society, Vol. 21(6), 2019, pp. 1272–1289.
‘The Digital Architecture of Time Management’, Science, Technology, & Human Values, Vol. 44, No. 2, 2019, pp. 315–337.

References

1950 births
Academics of London Business School
Academics of the London School of Economics
Academic staff of the Australian National University
Australian sociologists
Australian women sociologists
Fellows of St John's College, Cambridge
Living people
Australian people of Polish-Jewish descent
Jewish sociologists
Jewish Australian writers
Jewish philosophers
Science and technology studies scholars
Fellows of the British Academy
Fellows of the Academy of the Social Sciences in Australia